A list of the films produced in Mexico in 1988 (see 1988 in film):

1988

External links

1988
Films
Lists of 1988 films by country or language